The National University Bulldogs are the collegiate men's varsity teams of National University in the University Athletic Association of the Philippines. The collegiate women's varsity teams are called the Lady Bulldogs while the high school varsity teams are called the Bullpups. The National University Athletic Director is Rustico “Otie” Camangian.

Team identity

Team monikers 
National University is one of the eight UAAP member schools that participate in different sporting events of the University Athletic Association of the Philippines. Bulldog is the mascot of all the varsity teams participating in these sporting events. The official varsity team names sourced from the school's official student publications are as follows:

University colors 
The university colors are:Blue and Gold

Team sports

Basketball

Men's 
In the early years of the UAAP, the NU Bulldogs were a competitive team in the league, winning a title in 1954. However, by the 1980s, NU was perennially in the bottom ranking of the team standings. In the late 1990s, they improved their ranking by moving up to the middle of the team standings with now PBA stars Danny Ildefonso and Lordy Tugade in their team roster, but still failed to make it to the Final Four.

In 2001, the Bulldogs made a surprise trip to the Final Four. They were led by Jeff Napa who tied the record of UE's Allan Caidic for the most number of three-points made in a single UAAP game. However, they were not able to advance to the Finals as they were beaten by the La Salle Green Archers in their Final Four series.

After season 64 (2001–02), the NU Bulldogs returned to their mediocre performance despite having outstanding players such as Rey Mendoza, Edwin Asoro, both members of the Mythical Five in separate seasons and Jonathan Fernandez, who found some success playing for the PBL's Harbour Centre squad and the SEABA RP team.

In the last quarter of year 2008, the family of Henry Sy of SM Prime Holdings acquired majority ownership of the National University. Aside from improving school facilities, the new management has included in their corporate plan the improvement of NU's sports programs. After ten years, the National U Bulldogs made it again to the UAAP Final Four in 2012.

In the 77th season of the league, the NU Bulldogs made a dramatic and amazing title run. At the start of the season, they were at the top of the standings above ADMU and DLSU (teams that are expected to come out strong in the season). But in the 2nd round of the tournament, the Bulldogs fell on the 4th spot tied with UE Red Warriors. They faced UE on a Knockout Game for the 4th seed, which they won 51–49. They have beaten the 1st seeded team in the league which is the ADMU Blue Eagles in 2 Do-or-Die games, making them the 2nd 'Number 4' team in the UAAP History to defeat the Number 1 team. After 44 years, NU made it again to the UAAP Finals. They faced the FEU Tamaraws in three games. After 60 long years of title drought, the National U Bulldogs clinched the title after winning against FEU, 75–59,  in a Do-or-Die Wednesday, October 15, 2014, at the Smart Araneta Coliseum with a Record-Breaking Crowd of 25, 138 (biggest crowd ever to watch a basketball game at the venue, considering the game was held on a Wednesday).

UAAP Season 85 (S.Y. 2022–23) rosters
The NU Bulldogs Basketball Team

Bulldogs basketball team recruits class of 2020

Women's 
The Lady Bulldogs have won six straight championships, including a winning streak of 100 straight games.

Junior 
After an incredible run to the title, the NU Bulldogs ended their trademark as "Perennial Doormats", "Bottom-Dwellers" and "Underdogs" and they became the Top Dogs of the league. They are expected to be a tough contender in the upcoming seasons of the UAAP. The NU Bullpups have won four UAAP championships in four years. They won the UAAP championships in Season 74, 76, 78, 81.

NU Bulldogs Basketball team Awards and other achievements

Volleyball 

The National University Bulldogs Spikers won their first UAAP volleyball title in season 75 (2012–2013), while the NU Lady Bulldogs Spikers won their first in season 16 (1953–54). As of UAAP Season 77 the NU Bulldogs have won 2 UAAP volleyball titles while the NU Lady Bulldogs have 3 UAAP championships (Season 16 (1953–54), Season 19 (1956–57) and Season 84 (2021–22)).

NU Bulldogs Volleyball teams Awards and other achievements

Rotation

Beach volleyball 
The school has men's and women's beach volleyball teams.

Baseball 
The Bulldogs have found recent success in the UAAP baseball tournament. After years in the bottom of the team standings, NU has made it four consecutive times to the Final 4, from season 72 (2009–10 ) to season 75 (2012–13). In season 74 (2011–12) they not only made it to the Finals but also won the championship, their third since 1965. Again they repeated their Finals appearance the following year, season 75 (2012–13). This time however, they were not as fortunate. They finished runner-up to Ateneo.

Softball

Performance sports

Cheerdance 

The National U Pep Squad performs at the halftime of the basketball games of the NU Bulldogs in the University Athletic Association of the Philippines and represents the university in the UAAP Cheerdance Competition along with the NU Cheer Squadron and NU Drummers. They were the champions for four consecutive years (2013, 2014, 2015, and 2016). Their closest rival is the UP Pep Squad and U.S.T. Salinggawi Dance Troup Group, which has been a consistent runner-up for the past three seasons. Ghicka Bernabe, a former member of FEU Cheering Squad, is the current head coach of the group.

NU Pep Squad Awards and other achievements 

Notes:
  - The NU Pep Squad and the FEU Cheering Squad finished the competition tied in the fourth place.

Group stunts division

Street Dance

NU Underdawgz Seniors' division Awards and other achievements

Notable alumni 

 Bryan Bagunas (Men's Volleyball)
 Narciso Bernardo (Men's Basketball)
 Danny Ildefonso (Men's Basketball)
 Carlos Loyzaga (NU High School Basketball)
 Jun Papa (Men's Basketball)
 Bobby Ray Parks Jr. (Men's Basketball)
 Troy Rosario (Men's Basketball)
 Jennylyn Reyes (Women's Volleyball)
 Myla Pablo (Women's Volleyball)
 Tin Patrimonio (Women's Tennis)
 Dindin Santiago-Manabat (Women's Volleyball)
 Jaja Santiago (Women's Volleyball)
 Risa Sato (Women's Volleyball)

UAAP Championships 

The table shows the number of championships of National University in the University Athletic Association of the Philippines (UAAP).
Updated after UAAP Season 85 Women's Chess

UAAP Championships Record 
The following tables show the rankings history of National University in the UAAP.

Seniors division 
 Gold border denotes overall championship season.

X – Cancelled 
DNP – Did Not Participate 
{| class="wikitable" style="font-size: 70%;"
|- bgcolor=#CFB53B
|rowspan=2 align="center"| UAAP Season ||colspan=15 align=center| Men's ||colspan=15 align=center| Women's ||colspan=2 align=center |COED
|- bgcolor="#efefef" align=center
|  || ||  ||  ||  ||  ||  ||  ||  ||  ||  ||  ||  ||  || ||  || ||  ||  ||  ||  ||  ||  ||  ||  ||  ||  ||  ||  || || || 
|- align="center" |- align="center"
|  Season 59 || bgcolor="black"| || 6th  || 7th || bgcolor="black"| || DNP || 7th || 8th || DNP || 5th || DNP || bgcolor=#FA8072| DNP || bgcolor="black"| || DNP || bgcolor=#9acdff|4th || DNP|| bgcolor="black"| || DNP || 8th || bgcolor="black"| || DNP || bgcolor="black"| || 7th || bgcolor="black"| || 6th || DNP || bgcolor=#FA8072|DNP || bgcolor="black"| || DNP || DNP || DNP || bgcolor="black"| || ?
|- align="center" |- align="center" ||
| Season 60 || bgcolor="black"| || 8th || bgcolor=#9acdff|4th || bgcolor="black"| || ? || ? || ? || ? || ? || ? || ? || bgcolor=#FA8072| ?|| ? || ? || ? || bgcolor="black"| || DNP  || 7th || bgcolor="black"| || ? || ? || ? || ? || ? || ? || ? || bgcolor=#FA8072| ?|| ? || ? || ?  || bgcolor="black"| || ?
|- align="center"
| Season 61 || bgcolor="black"| || 7th || bgcolor=#9acdff|4th || bgcolor="black"| || DNP || 8th || 7th || DNP || 8th || DNP || DNP || DNP || DNP || 5th || DNP|| bgcolor="black"| || DNP || 7th || bgcolor="black"| || DNP || DNP || 7th || DNP || 8th || DNP || DNP || DNP || DNP || DNP || DNP || bgcolor="black"| || ?
|- align="center"
| Season 62 || bgcolor="black"| || 7th || 7th || bgcolor="black"| || ? || ? || ? || ? || ? || ? || ? || ? || ? || ? || ? || bgcolor="black"| || DNP || 7th || bgcolor="black"| || ? || ? || ? || ? || ? || ? || ? || ? || ? || ? || ? || bgcolor="black"| || ?
|- align="center"
| Season 63 || bgcolor="black"| || 7th || bgcolor=#9acdff|4th  || bgcolor="black"| || ? || ? || ? || ? || ? || ? || ? || ? || ? || ? || ? || bgcolor="black"|  || DNP || 6th || bgcolor="black"| || ? || ? || ? || ? || ? || ? || ? || ? || ? || ? || ? || bgcolor="black"| || ?
|- align="center"
| Season 64 ||bgcolor="black"| || bgcolor=#9acdff|4th || 5th || bgcolor="black"| || DNP || 8th || 8th || DNP || 7th || DNP || DNP || DNP || DNP || 8th || DNP|| bgcolor="black"| || DNP || 7th || bgcolor="black"| || DNP || DNP || 8th || DNP || 8th || DNP || DNP || DNP || DNP || DNP || DNP || bgcolor="black"| || ?
|- align="center"
| Season 65 ||bgcolor="black"| || 8th || 7th || bgcolor="black"| || DNP || 7th || 8th || DNP || 7th || DNP || DNP || DNP || DNP || 6th || DNP || bgcolor="black"| || DNP || 7th || bgcolor="black"| || DNP || 7th || 8th || DNP || 7th || DNP || DNP || DNP || DNP || DNP || DNP || bgcolor="black"| ||8th|- align="center"
| Season 66 ||bgcolor="black"| || 8th || 7th || bgcolor="black"| || DNP || 8th || 8th || DNP || DNP || DNP || DNP || DNP || DNP || bgcolor=#9acdff|4th || DNP || bgcolor="black"| || DNP || 8th || bgcolor="black"| || DNP || 7th ||  8th || DNP || DNP || DNP || DNP || DNP || DNP || DNP || DNP || bgcolor="black"| ||8th|- align="center"
| Season 67 ||bgcolor="black"| || 8th || 7th || bgcolor="black"| || DNP || 8th || 8th || DNP || DNP || DNP || DNP || DNP || DNP || bgcolor="#cc9966"|3rd || DNP || bgcolor="black"| || DNP || 8th || bgcolor="black"| || DNP || 7th || DNP || DNP || DNP || DNP || DNP || DNP || DNP || DNP || DNP|| bgcolor="black"| ||8th|- align="center"
| Season 68 ||bgcolor="black"| || 8th || 7th || bgcolor="black"| || DNP || 8th || 8th || DNP || 8th || DNP || DNP || DNP || DNP || bgcolor=#9acdff|4th || DNP || bgcolor="black"| || DNP || 8th || bgcolor="black"| || DNP || 7th || DNP || DNP || DNP || DNP || DNP || DNP || DNP || |DNP || DNP || bgcolor="black"| ||8th|- align="center"
| Season 69 ||bgcolor="black"| || 7th || bgcolor=#9acdff|4th || bgcolor="#FA8072|7th || DNP || 6th || 6th || DNP || 7th || DNP || DNP || DNP || DNP || bgcolor=|4th || DNP|| bgcolor="black"| || 7th || 7th || bgcolor=#FA8072|6th || DNP || 6th || 5th || DNP || DNP || DNP || DNP || DNP || DNP || DNP || DNP || bgcolor="black"| || 7th|- align="center"
| Season 70 ||bgcolor="black"| || 6th || 8th || 6th || DNP ||  6th ||  5th || DNP || DNP || DNP || DNP || DNP || DNP || bgcolor=#9acdff|4th || DNP || bgcolor="black"| || 8th || 6th || 5th || DNP || 6th || 7th || DNP || 8th || DNP || DNP || DNP || DNP || DNP || DNP || bgcolor="black"| || 8th|- align="center"
| Season 71 ||bgcolor="black"| || 8th || 8th || 6th || DNP || 6th || 7th || DNP || 8th || DNP || DNP || DNP || DNP || 5th || DNP || bgcolor="black"| || 7th || 8th || 5th || DNP || 7th || 6th || DNP || 8th || DNP || DNP || DNP || DNP || DNP || DNP || bgcolor="black"| ||8th|- align="center"
| Season 72 ||bgcolor="black"| || 7th || 7th  || 8th || DNP || 7th || 6th || DNP || 7th || DNP || DNP || DNP || DNP || bgcolor="silver"|2nd || DNP || bgcolor="black"| || 7th || 8th || 6th || DNP || 5th || 6th || DNP || 7th || DNP || DNP || DNP || DNP || DNP || DNP || bgcolor="black"| || 5th|- align="center"
| Season 73 ||bgcolor="black"| || 5th || 7th || 8th || DNP ||  7th || 6th || DNP || bgcolor="#cc9966"|3rd || DNP || DNP || DNP  || DNP || bgcolor="silver"|2nd || DNP || bgcolor="black"| || 5th || 5th || 8th || DNP || 5th || 6th || DNP|| 8th  || DNP || DNP || DNP  || DNP  || DNP || DNP || bgcolor="black"| || 7th|- align="center"
| Season 74 ||bgcolor="black"| || 5th || 5th || 7th || DNP || 5th || 6th || bgcolor="silver"|3nd || bgcolor="silver"|2nd || DNP || DNP || DNP || DMP  || bgcolor="gold"|1st || DNP || bgcolor="black"| || 6th || 7th || 7th || DNP || 5th || 6th || DNP || 8th || DNP || DNP || DNP || DNP  || DNP || DNP || bgcolor=#FA8072|DNP || 6th|- align="center"
| Season 75 ||bgcolor="black"| || bgcolor="#cc9966"|3rd || bgcolor="gold"|1st || bgcolor="gold"|1st || DNP || 5th || 6th || bgcolor="gold"|1st || bgcolor="gold"|1st || DNP || 7th || 7th || DNP || bgcolor="silver"|2nd || 6th || bgcolor="black"| || 5th || bgcolor=#9acdff|4th || 5th || DNP || bgcolor=#9acdff|4th || 5th || bgcolor=#9acdff|4th || 8th || DNP || DNP || 5th || DNP || bgcolor="silver"|2nd || DNP || bgcolor=#FA8072|DNP || bgcolor="#cc9966"|3rd|- align="center"
| Season 76 ||bgcolor="black"| || bgcolor=#9acdff|4th || bgcolor="gold"|1st || bgcolor="gold"|1st''' || DNP || 5th || 5th || bgcolor="gold"|1st || bgcolor="silver"|2nd || DNP || 7th || 7th || DNP || bgcolor="#cc9966"|3rd || 6th || bgcolor="black"| || bgcolor="silver"|2nd || bgcolor="#cc9966"|3rd || 5th || DNP || 5th || 5th || bgcolor="gold"|1st || 8th || DNP || DNP || 6th || DNP || bgcolor="silver"|2nd || DNP|| 7th|| bgcolor="gold"|1st|- align="center"
| Season 77||bgcolor="black"| || bgcolor="gold"|1st || bgcolor="silver"|2nd || bgcolor="gold"|1st || DNP || 5th || 5th || bgcolor="gold"|1st || bgcolor="gold"|1st || DNP || DNP || bgcolor="#cc9966"|3rd || DNP || bgcolor=#9acdff|4th || 5th || bgcolor="black"| || bgcolor="gold"|1st || bgcolor="#cc9966"|3rd || '5th || DNP || bgcolor=#9acdff|4th  || 5th || bgcolor="gold"|1st || 8th || DNP || DNP || 5th || DNP || bgcolor=#9acdff|4th || DNP || 6th || bgcolor="gold"|1st|- align="center"
| Season 78 ||bgcolor="black"| || bgcolor=#9acdff|4th || bgcolor="silver"|2nd || bgcolor="#cc9966"|3rd || 5th || bgcolor="gold"|1st  || bgcolor=#9acdff|4th || bgcolor="gold"|1st || bgcolor="gold"|1st || DNP || DNP || 7th || DNP  ||  bgcolor="#cc9966"|3rd || 6th || bgcolor="black"| || bgcolor="gold"|1st || 5th || 7th || DNP || bgcolor=#9acdff|4th  || 5th || bgcolor="gold"|1st || 6th || DNP || DNP || 6th || DNP || bgcolor="#cc9966"|3rd  || DNP || 6th|| bgcolor="gold"|1st|- align="center"
| Season 79||bgcolor="black"| || 5th || bgcolor="silver"|2nd || bgcolor=#9acdff|4th || 6th || bgcolor="gold"|1st || bgcolor="#cc9966"|3rd || 5th || bgcolor="gold"|1st || DNP || DNP || bgcolor="gold"|1st || DNP || 5th || 5th || bgcolor="black"| || bgcolor="gold"|1st || 6th || 5th || DNP || DNP || 5th || bgcolor="gold"|1st || bgcolor=#9acdff|4th || DNP || DNP || bgcolor="gold"|1st || DNP || bgcolor="#cc9966"|3rd || DNP || 6th|| bgcolor="gold"|1st|- align="center"
| Season 80 || bgcolor="#cc9966"|3rd|| 6th || bgcolor="gold"|1st || bgcolor="gold"|1st || 5th || bgcolor="gold"|1st || bgcolor="gold"|1st || DNP || bgcolor="gold"|1st || DNP || DNP || bgcolor="gold"|1st || DNP || 6th || 6th || bgcolor="gold"|1st  || bgcolor="gold"|1st || bgcolor=#9acdff|4th || 7th || 5th || 6th  || 7th || DNP || bgcolor=#9acdff|4th || DNP || DNP || 6th || DNP || bgcolor=#9acdff|4th || DNP || 6th|| bgcolor=#9acdff|4th|- align="center"
| Season 81 || bgcolor=#FA8072|7th|| 7th || bgcolor="gold"|1st || bgcolor="#cc9966"|3rd || DNP || bgcolor="silver"|2nd  || bgcolor="silver"|2nd || bgcolor="gold"|1st || bgcolor="gold"|1st || bgcolor=#9acdff|4th || DNP || bgcolor="gold"|1st || DNP || 5th|| 7th || bgcolor="gold"|1st || bgcolor="gold"|1st || 6th || bgcolor=#9acdff|4th || DNP ||  7th || 7th || bgcolor="gold"|1st || bgcolor=#9acdff|4th || DNP || DNP || bgcolor="gold"|1st || DNP || bgcolor=#9acdff|4th || DNP || bgcolor=#9acdff|4th|| bgcolor="gold"|1st|- align="center"
| Season 82 || X || 8th || X || bgcolor="#cc9966"|3rd || DNP ||  bgcolor=#9acdff|4th || bgcolor="silver"|2nd || X || bgcolor="#cc9966"|3rd || X || DNP || bgcolor="gold"|1st || DNP || X || X || X || bgcolor="gold"|1st || X || 8th || DNP || 7th || 8th || X || bgcolor="#cc9966"|3rd || DNP || X|| bgcolor="gold"|1st || DNP || DNP || X|| bgcolor="silver"|2nd|| bgcolor="gold"|1st|- align="center"
| Season 83 || colspan=32| Cancelled due to Covid-19 Pandemic
|- align="center"
| Season 84 ||  bgcolor=#9acdff|4th || 6th || X ||  bgcolor="silver"|2nd || X ||  DNP || X || X || X || X || X || X || X || X || X || bgcolor="gold"|1st|| X || bgcolor="gold"|1st || X || X || bgcolor="gold"|1st || X || X || X || X || X || X || X || X || X || bgcolor="silver"|2nd || bgcolor="#cc9966"|3rd'|}

 Juniors division 
 Gold border denotes overall championship season.X – Cancelled DNP'' – Did Not Participate

UAAP General Championship 
The table shows the Rank of National University in the University Athletic Association of the Philippines (UAAP) General Championships.

See also 
 University Athletic Association of the Philippines
 National University (Philippines)

References 

National University (Philippines) Bulldogs
Former Philippine Basketball League teams
College sports teams in Metro Manila
Spikers' Turf
Shakey's V-League
National University (Philippines)
Former National Collegiate Athletic Association (Philippines) teams